Josia subcuneifera is a moth of the  family Notodontidae. It is found in Ecuador and Peru.

External links
Species page at Tree of Life project

Notodontidae of South America
Moths described in 1902